Zionist entity, Zionist regime, and Zionist enemy are interchangeable pejorative terms used predominantly by Arabs and Muslims in reference to the State of Israel. Many commentators believe that the terms are used to de-legitimize Israeli sovereignty by attempting to push a narrative in which Israel is nothing more than a settler-colonial project. The terms also pin an alternative definition to Zionism (the Jewish nationalist movement that led to Israel's founding), primarily through the implication that Zionism is an ideology centred on racial discrimination.

Meaning and intent
The term is described as a means of expressing hostility towards Israel, refusing to acknowledge its existence, and denying its legitimacy or right to exist.

Virginia Q. Tilley argues that the term implies condemnation of the idea of a Jewish state, but not necessarily of a Jewish presence. Matthew Gray writes that the term denies Israel the status of a "state", and emphasizes Israel's Zionist philosophy. Its use by Arab state media and leaders, even though other terms are equally "politically useful", "reinforces the state's anti-Israel posture and the perception of Israel as a sinister threat". 

Describing it as "derogatory, indirect language", Darrell Jodock states its intent is to "deny Israel any place in the family of nations". Referring to it as a "common epithet", Eric Sundquist indicates that it "echoed the Arab view, repeated in the core doctrine of the PLO, that Israel was no state at all but an illegal colonialist excrescence".

Usage

In Arab media
Before 1967, "Zionist entity" was the standard term used by Arabs and the Arab media to refer to Israel, and was particularly popular in official broadcasts of Egypt, Syria, and Jordan during the 1960s and 1970s. The use of this term has persisted since then in Egyptian newspapers. the state-controlled press of Syria, Lebanon's Al-Manar, and the Jordanian media. It is also the only term for Israel used on Radio Méditerranée, a French radio station with a daily audience of around 600,000 "mainly French people of Arab descent".

Political
The term "Zionist entity" is used by some Arab states, and by "politicians and intellectuals throughout the Arab world". Lutz Edzard describes it as "the traditional Arabic political term for Israel", stating it is used in Arabic (particularly Iraqi) international documents. Describing its use in Jordan, Joseph Nevo includes it as part of "Arab rhetoric and its traditional reluctance to use the term 'Israel'". Middle East journalist Barbara Victor writes that when she went to Tripoli in 1986 to interview Muammar Gaddafi, it was illegal to use any term except "Zionist entity" to refer to Israel. It has been used regularly at the United Nations, by (among others) Libya, Syria, Iraq, Yemen, and the Organisation of Islamic Cooperation. It is also used by Iran, and by groups such as Hezbollah, al-Quds Brigades, Hamas, Islamic Jihad, the Palestinian Authority, and the Palestine Liberation Organization (PLO). Use by the latter became "less prominent" in the late 1980s after the Camp David Accords and PLO recognition of Israel, but has since become common again.

Following the Islamic Revolution, Iranian leaders frequently refer to Israel as the "Zionist regime".

Other
In his book After the Last Sky: Palestinian Lives, Edward Said writes that one of the differentiators between Arab citizens of Israel and other Palestinians was that the former referred to Israel "as a real country, rather than 'the Zionist entity. In a later essay, he described the phrase's use by Arabs as "a foolish and wasteful policy".

See also
 Arab–Israeli conflict
 Israeli–Palestinian conflict
 Anti-Zionism
 International recognition of Israel
 Legitimacy of Israel

References

Anti-Zionism
Political slurs
Political neologisms
Political terminology of Iran
Arabic words and phrases
Persian words and phrases
Mass media about the Arab–Israeli conflict
Mass media about the Iran–Israel proxy conflict